Cociu may refer to several villages in Romania:

 Cociu, a village in Motoșeni Commune, Bacău County
 Cociu, a village in Șintereag Commune, Bistriţa-Năsăud County